Temple Beth Israel is a Reform synagogue located at 3004 Union Avenue in Altoona, Pennsylvania. It was found in 1874 as the Orthodox Ahavath Achim (brotherly love in Hebrew). The congregation moved to adopt Reform liturgy in 1877. In 1890 the congregation reorganized and was renamed Mountain City Hebrew  Reformed Congregation. The congregation changed its name to Temple Beth Israel in 1922, and moved to its current location in 1924.

Former rabbis include Nathan Kaber, Gary Klein, Richard Zionts, Burt Schuman (1995–2006), and Nicole Luna.

From 2006 to 2010, Beth Israel was served by student rabbis or lay leaders. Audrey Korotkin joined as a part-time rabbi in 2010. She had previously served in three other synagogues.

With a membership of approximately 70 families, Temple Beth Israel serves the greater Altoona metropolitan area. In 2011, Temple Beth Israel also hosted the Altoona Alliance Church for all of its services and functions; the Church was in temporary quarters that were sold.

External links
 Temple Beth Israel web site

Notes

Buildings and structures in Altoona, Pennsylvania
Religious organizations established in 1874
Reform synagogues in Pennsylvania
1874 establishments in Pennsylvania
Religious buildings and structures in Blair County, Pennsylvania